Lecithocera alampes is a moth in the family Lecithoceridae. It was described by Turner in 1919. It is found in Australia, where it has been recorded from Queensland and New South Wales.

The wingspan is 13–17 mm. The forewings are brownish-fuscous or fuscous. The stigmata are very obscure, the plical beneath the first discal, the second discal double. The hindwings are grey.

References

Moths described in 1919
alampes